In Nigeria, there has been a major progress in the improvement of health since 1950. Although lower respiratory infections, neonatal disorders and HIV/AIDS have ranked the topmost causes of deaths in Nigeria, in the case of other diseases such as monkeypox, polio, malaria and tuberculosis, progress has been achieved. Among other threats to health are malnutrition, pollution and road traffic accidents. In 2020, Nigeria had one of the highest cases of COVID-19 in Africa.

The Human Rights Measurement Initiative finds that Nigeria is fulfilling 48.2% of what it should be fulfilling for the right to health based on its level of income. When looking at the right to health with respect to children, Nigeria achieves 66.6% of what is expected based on its current income. In regards to the right to health amongst the adult population, the country achieves only 61.7% of what is expected based on the nation's level of income. Nigeria falls into the "very bad" category when evaluating the right to reproductive health because the nation is fulfilling only 16.3% of what the nation is expected to achieve based on the resources (income) it has available.

Life expectancy and under-5 mortality rate 

Life expectancy at birth in Nigeria increased from 49.4 in 2007 to approximately 54 in 2017. In a decade (2007–2017), U5MR per 1000 live births drastically reduced from 145.7 to 100.2. In comparison with some other reference countries (Ghana, Malawi, Rwanda, Sudan, Norway, the United States, China and Australia), as shown in the second Table below, Nigeria with a population of about 195 million has performed poorly. The country has not done better when compared with the world average and the World Bank regions namely: East Asia & Pacific Northwest, Europe & Central Asia, Latin America & the Caribbean, Middle East & North Africa, South Asia, and Sub-Saharan Africa.

Source: Institute for Health Metric and Evaluation (IHME)

Source: Under-5 Mortality Rate (per 1,000 live births) and Life expectancy at birth (years). Estimates developed by the UN Inter-agency Group for Child Mortality Estimation

(UNICEF, WHO, World Bank, UN DESA Population Division)

Source: United Nations Population Division. World Population Prospects: 2017 Revision. The World Bank Group

Maternal mortality 

Maternal mortality rate in Nigeria is above 800 per 100,000 live births. In 2013, the rate in Nigeria was 560 deaths per 100,000 live births; whereas in 1980, it was 516 deaths 100,000 per live births. This may be as a result of poor health facilities, lack of access to quality health care, malnutrition due to poverty, herder-farmer conflicts, female genital mutilations, abortions, and displacements due to Boko Haram terrorism in the North East of Nigeria. In Nigeria the lifetime risk of death for pregnant women is 1 in 22. Nigeria's abortion laws make it one of the most restrictive countries regarding abortion.

A study published in 2019 investigated the competency of emergency obstetric care among health providers and found it lower than average. Another study shows decrease in maternal mortality in the southern part of the country while it's still on the increase in North due to low level of education.

Maternal mortality affects the socioeconomic development of the country negatively. By 2030, if Nigeria is to reduce maternal mortality ratio to less than 70 per 100, 000 live births (SDG goal 3 – target 1), all hands must be on deck to achieve it. People can start by promoting and protecting their own health and the health of those around them, by making well-informed choices, practising safe sex and attending antenatal care in government approved health centres. There should be more awareness in communities about the importance of good health, healthy lifestyles as well as people's right to quality health care services, especially for the most vulnerable such as women and children. Government, local leaders and other decision makers should be held accountable to their commitments to improve people's access to health and health care.

Water supply and sanitation 

Access to an improved water source stagnated at 47% of the population from 1990 to 2006, then increased to 54% in 2010. In urban areas access decreased from 80% to 65% in 2006, and then recovered to 74% in 2010.

Adequate sanitation is typically in the form of septic tanks, as there is no central sewage system, except for in Abuja and some areas of Lagos. A 2006 study estimated that only 1% of Lagos households were connected to general sewers. In 2016, mortality rate attributed to unsafe water, unsafe sanitation and lack of hygiene is 68.6 deaths per 100,000 populations.

HIV/AIDS 

The Nigeria HIV/AIDS indicator and impact survey 2018 revealed that the national HIV prevalence rate among adults ages 15–49 is 1.4 percent. The prevalence of HIV in Nigeria varies widely by region and states. Akwa Ibom State has the highest prevalence rate of HIV with 5.6 percent and disease burden of 200,051 percentage of deaths and disability-adjusted life years (DALYs), and followed by Benue State (4.9%, 188,482 DALYs) and Rivers (3.8%, 196,225 DALYs). The States, Jigawa (12,804 DALYs) and Katsina (26,597 DALYs) both have the lowest prevalence of 0.3 percent. The epidemic is more concentrated and driven by high-risk behaviors, including having multiple sexual partners, low risk perceptions, inadequate access to quality health care services, as well as street/road hawking of goods by itinerant workers (hawkers) especially, around military and police checkpoints. Other risk factors that contribute to the spread of HIV, including prostitution, high prevalence of sexually transmitted infections, clandestine high-risk homosexual/heterosexual practices, and women trafficking. Youth and young adults in Nigeria are particularly vulnerable to HIV, with young women at higher risk than young men.

Malaria 
Malaria, a disease caused by mosquitoes has resulted in untold morbidity and mortality in Nigeria. Although, there has been slight decline in malarial transmission and deaths since 2007 it ranked the number one cause of deaths in the country, the disease still remain unflagging. As of 2012, the malaria prevalence rate was 11 percent. A part of this data is from the President's Malaria Initiative which identifies Nigeria as a high-burden country. Nigeria's branch dealing with this problem, the National Malaria Control Program recognized the problem and embraced the World Malaria Day theme of "End Malaria for Good".

In 2017, according to IHME ranking, malaria ranked the fourth on the causes of most deaths in Nigeria with U5MR and under-1 child mortality of 103.2 deaths and 62.6 deaths per 1,000 live births respectively. With pockets of high-level transmission persisting in states across Nigeria coupled with the never-ending struggle against drug and insecticide resistance as well as the socio-economic costs associated with a failure to eradicate the disease, malaria eradication by 2050 seems unachievable. However, the step to eradicate the disease is a bold attainable goal if concerted efforts are put in place. The challenge of ineffective management of malaria prevention and control programs and inadequate use of data to inform strategies should be addressed. The control of mosquitoes, high quality diagnosis, and treatment are very necessary if the problem is to be successfully eradicated. Strong and committed leadership at various levels of government in Nigeria, reinforced through transparency and independent accountability mechanisms are very important to ensure a complete eradication of malaria in the country.

Endemic diseases 
In 1985, an incidence of yellow fever devastated a town in Nigeria, leading to the death of 1000 people. In a span of 5 years, the epidemic grew, with a resulting rise in mortality. The yellow fever vaccine has been in existence since the 1930s. There are other endemic diseases in the country which include malaria, hepatitis A, hepatitis B, typhoid, meningitis. and lassa fever. Travelers are normally advised to get travel vaccines and medicines because of the risk of these diseases in the country.

Food
Nutrition, especially in the north of the country, is often poor. Since 2002, food staples are supposed to be fortified with nutrients such as vitamin A, folic acid, zinc, iodine and iron. Bill Gates, said there had been "pushback" by some in Nigerian industries as this reduced profit margins. The Bill & Melinda Gates Foundation is donating $5 million over four years to implement a rigorous testing regime to make sure these standards are met.  These nutrients would reach poorer children who ate mainly a cereal and beans diet at very low cost and reduce the risk of stunting.  Vitamin A would reduce the risk of death from measles or diarrhoea. In some districts 7% of children die before they reach the age of five.  Nearly half of these are attributable to malnutrition. Aliko Dangote, whose companies supply salt, sugar and flour, said there would need to be a crack down on the import of low-quality foodstuff, often smuggled into local markets.

Pollution 
Traffic congestion in Lagos, environmental pollution:water pollution, and air pollution; and noise pollution are major health issues.

Water 

The aquatic systems in Nigeria are reservoirs for toxic chemicals. The activities of oil and gas industries as well as widespread discharge of effluents into water ways is an eyesore. Chemical substances such as polyaromatic hydrocarbons, per- and polyfluoroalkyl substances as well as heavy metals find their way into oceans, rivers and streams and contaminate them. In 2018, The Nation newspaper reported improper waste disposal in the country, emphasizing that there is no proper waste management system, hence the cause of the indiscriminate dumping of refuse, used polythene bags, plastic bottles and other liquid and solid wastes in the environment. The Huffingtonpost in May 2017 raised an alarm on the incessant dumping of plastics in the ocean. It posited that 'the oceans are drowning in plastics – and no one is paying attention to the menace'; and by indication, it seems people are overwhelmed by their own waste. Amidst this, Ellen MacArthur Foundation in Partnership with the World Economic Forum predicted that by 2050, plastic in the oceans will outweigh fish. With expected surge in consumption, negative externalities related to plastics will multiply by that time. Most wastes materials contain estrogenic chemicals -  (estrogens) and androgenic chemicals - (androgens) and they have potential to leach into the surrounding environment, impact on the ecosystem and may alter hormonal functions. These contaminants and many other chemicals are toxic to aquatic lives, most often affecting their life spans and ability to reproduce; they make their way up the food chain as predator eats prey and bioaccumulate in the adipose tissues of these organisms.

Air 

Nigeria's air quality is said to be among the most unsafe globally (ranked 4th) and four of its major cities – Onitsha, Aba, Kaduna, and Umuahia are among the worst polluted cities in the world in term of particulate matter of size 10 micrometers and below (PM10). The most recent report by WHO indicate that the country's annual mean concentration PM2.5 is 72 μg/m3, far exceeding the recommended maximum of 10 μg/m3. Data from the institutes of Health Metrics and Evaluation on Global disease burden (GBD) was used to ascertain the cause of death and DALYs in Nigeria from 2007 – 2017 and published literature where reviewed. According to World Health data report, most of the highest ranked causes of DALYs are related to environmental risk factors including chronic respiratory diseases, cardiovascular diseases, communicable diseases, maternal, neonatal and nutritional disease, which has cause about 800 thousand deaths and 26 million DALYs per year in Nigeria. Major environmental risks include indoor air pollution, ambient air pollution, water, sanitation and hygiene, although there is prolong and progressive decline in these except ambient PM and ground ozone pollution which show a steady rise associated with death and DALYs in Nigeria indicating a significant concern in environment health situation.

Causes 
Nigeria is home to a lot of automobiles including cars, motorbikes, heavy duty vehicles like buses, lorries etc. that are old and has past their best days in term of energy efficiency. They emit a lot of unhealthy fumes including nitrogen oxides, sulfur oxides, carbon dioxides, carbon monoxides, particulate matter etc. A large amount of waste across the country including household and industrial are disposed by combustion which releases fumes from both organic items, synthetic material like plastic, rubber as well as from dangerous items like batteries and e-waste etc.  Most households also contribute to emission of noxious smokes and particulate matters like carbon soot etc. as they rely on inefficient kerosene stoves, fire wood and charcoal for cooking and most time this is done indoor with poor ventilation. Many offices and residences contribute to increased pollution level of the air with noxious fumes from generators which are used as substitute to the public epileptic power supply and these fumes are often released in largely unventilated areas. Other major sources including emission from factories and industries which release similar fumes like automobiles but uses mainly diesel in lieu of gasoline

Road traffic accidents 
Every year 1.25 million people are killed in a road traffic crashes. Between 20 and 50 million more people suffer non-fatal injuries, with many incurring a disability. Road traffic injuries cause considerable economic losses to individuals, their families, and to nations as a whole. These losses arise from the cost of treatment as well as lost productivity for those killed or disabled by their injuries, and for family members who need to take time off work or school to care for the injured. Road traffic crashes cost most countries 3% of their gross domestic product. Road traffic injuries are the leading cause of death among people aged between 15 and 29 years.

Over 3 400 people die on the world's roads every day and tens of millions of people are injured or disabled every year. Children, pedestrians, cyclists and older people are among the most vulnerable of road users. WHO works with partners - governmental and nongovernmental - around the world to raise the profile of the preventability of road traffic injuries and promote good practice related to addressing key behaviour risk factors – speed, drink-driving, the use of motorcycle helmets, seat-belts and child restraints.

With the continued dangerous trend of road traffic collision in Nigeria, which in 2013 placed it as one of the most road traffic accident-prone countries worldwide (the most in Africa), the Nigerian government saw the need to establish the present Federal Road Safety Corps in 1988 to address the carnage on the highways.

Level and trend of road traffic accidents
The Federal Road Safety Corps (FRSC) says 456 people died and 3404 others were injured in 826 accidents recorded nationwide in January (2018).

The FRSC stated this in its CCC report for January signed by its Corps Marshal, Boboye Oyeyemi.

The UN Sustainable Development Goals 

In September 2015, the General Assembly adopted the 2030 Agenda for Sustainable Development that includes 17 Sustainable Development Goals (SDGs). Building on the principle of "leaving no one behind", the new Agenda emphasizes a holistic approach to achieving sustainable development for all. Target 3.6 under Sustainable Development Goal 3 is designed specifically to addresses the issue of road traffic accident. It says "By 2020, halve (50% less) the number of global deaths and injuries from road traffic accidents".

The Federal Government of Nigeria has put some mechanisms in place to ensure implementation of the SDGs in the country however, Nigeria is still far from achieving this goal.

Traditional/Alternative medicine
As recent reports have shown, in addition to the many benefits there are also risks associated with the different types of Traditional medicine / alternative medicine. Although consumers today have widespread access to various traditional/alternative medicine treatments and therapies, they often do not have enough information on what to check when using them in order to avoid unnecessary harm. While traditional medicine has a lot to contribute to the health and economy, much harm has resulted from unregulated sale and misuse of traditional/alternative medicine and herbs in the country and has significantly delayed patients' seeking professional healthcare.

Climate change

In recent times, more attention has been drawn to the effects of climate change around the world. A lot of unprecedented changes are being recorded in the weather conditions of different regions and countries. These have manifested in form of wildfires, torrential rains and other extreme weather outcomes. It has been pointed out that the health effects of climate change will increase dramatically over the next few years and pose a risk to human life and the well-being of billions of people.

With around 200 million people, Nigeria is the most populated country in Africa. As the continent's main exporter of oil, Nigeria faces the challenge of balancing global energy demands and domestic economic stability with the need to address climate and environmental challenges. The impact of climate change in Nigeria could include rising temperatures, more intense and frequent extreme weather events and sea level rise. For the population, this could result in increased water and food insecurity, higher exposure to heat stress and ultraviolet radiation; changes in infectious and vector-borne disease transmission patterns; and an increased threat to coastal communities facing sea level rise. It is however important to add that adequate adaptation and mitigation could help to protect the population, presenting opportunities for actions towards better health outcomes even in the face of numerous challenges posed by climate change.

The greatest health risk is for illness to result in mortality. Climate change has the potential to exacerbate prevalent diseases as well as emerging ones like High blood pressure, psychosis, neurosis and congenital malformations. Climate change creates overwhelming problems for an already impoverished populace.

Flooding is a consequence of climate change from rise in sea level and poor infrastructure, especially with drainage systems planning and design. For instance, southern Nigeria is highly susceptible to flooding; particularly Lagos, the commercial hub of the country, which is said to be one meter above the sea level, is threatened with possible extinction. The direct health implications of flooding could be deduced to include direct water borne diseases like typhoid, cholera, pneumonia, diarrhea and malaria. These, as we will see in the table below are diseases that already immensely burden the Nigerian populace.

The WHO has identified Schistosomiasis, African trypanosomiasis, malaria, lymphatic filariasis, onchocerciasis, and leishmaniasis as "major tropical diseases". This is in consideration of their public health significance and economic consequences on afflicted individuals, families and societies. The devastating effects of these diseases are summarized in the words of Hiroshi Nakajima, former Director General, WHO: "beyond their toll of individual illness and death, these tropical diseases have insidious effects on society. They impede on national and individual development, make fertile land inhospitable, impair intellectual and physical growth and exact a huge cost in terms of treatment and control".

Meningitis, measles, chicken pox and other health risks like high blood pressure and dehydration in pregnancy are also believed to be amplified by high temperatures. The number of people in emerging countries is expected to increase by 2.3 billion in 2005 to 4 billion in 2030. This means more carbon emotions due to human activities. Growing urban sprawls, including poor housing also further compounds the problem. These changes inevitably increase the peril heat waves in the cities due to the effects of climate change.

Additionally, high temperature affects diseases spread and rates of transmission of vector-borne and rodent-borne diseases. Temperature affects pathogen maturation rate and mosquito replication, the insect's density in a specific area, and increases infection likelihood. Malaria parasites are recognized to remain sensitive to temperature, particularly throughout the so-called extrinsic period of incubation for parasite lifecycle, which happens once the parasite remains alive in the mosquitos. For example, warmer temperatures promote faster reproductive cycles in mosquitoes that transit malaria and in the parasite itself.

Although Nigeria has identified with the rest of the world in acknowledging climate change and its potential impacts for health and wellbeing, there are still gaps in the planning and implementation of actions to mitigate these effects. The WHO- Climate and Health Country Profile for Nigeria (2015), highlights the successes and shortcomings that characterize the country's climate change response. These include: identifying a national focal point for climate change in the Ministry of Health and the development of a national health adaptation strategy. However, no actions have been implemented towards building institutional and technical capacities to work on climate change and health. Also, Nigeria has climate information included in its Integrated Disease Surveillance and Response system, including development of early warning and response systems for climate-sensitive health risks. Albeit, no activities have been implanted to increase resilience of health infrastructure. Finally, it is important to note that no financial commitments (both domestic and international funds) have been made to implements any action towards health resilience to climate change.

These gaps present opportunities for actions, the implementation of which has potential to better prepare Nigeria as a country to mitigate the health risks that climate change poses to its people. The WHO suggests a comprehensive vulnerability and adaptation assessment with a focus on health that includes relevant stakeholders from all sectors and an estimate of the costs to implement health resilience to climate change, covering infrastructure as well as institutional and technical capacities. Furthermore, actions need to be taken, that will ensure greening of the health sector, such as promoting the use of renewable energy, and finally, conducting a valuation of the co-benefits to health of climate mitigation policies. This will, among other benefits, help to monitor progress.

See also 
 Healthcare in Nigeria
 Federal Ministry of Health
 Smoking in Nigeria

References

Further consideration
Nigeria's Neglected Diseases, National Public Radio, 3-part series. 12–13 March 2007.

External links
 "'A breakdown of our primary health care system'," Seattle Post-Intelligencer